Smita Jaykar is an Indian actress known for playing  supporting roles in Bollywood movies and TV shows. She is currently working on a theatrical adaptation of Devdas with Ashvin Gidwani Productions (AGP World).

A native of the Thakurdwar neighbourhood in South Mumbai, she is a Maharashtrian. Her husband, Mohan Jaykar, is the son of esteemed Marathi barrister Barr Jaykar. She is known for her roles, most often as a mother, in Marathi-language television serials and films.

Jaykar is a very spiritual person. She conducts lectures on auras and chakras.

Filmography

 Adko Dadko (2022, Gujarati)
 Petipack (2022, Gujarati)
 Mimi (2021)
 Chhoti Si Guzaarish (2017)... Sugna
 Akira (2016)... Akira's mother
 Kaanu (2016)
 Bezubaan Ishq (2015) Laxmi Shah.
 Sonali Cable (2014).
 Samrat & Co.  (2014)... Narayani Dave.
 Anuradha (2014) 
 Yaariyan (2014) 
 Tere Naal Love Ho Gaya  (2012)... Viren's mother.
 Thank You (2011) Sanjana's Mother
 Florida Road (2010)... Kiran
 The Hangman (2010)... Parvati
 Naughty @ 40 (2009) ... Maya
 Ajab Prem Ki Ghazab Kahani (2009)... Sharda
 Ek Vivaah... Aisa Bhi (2008) (as Smita Jayakar)... Mrs. Ajmera
 Mumbai Meri Jaan (2008)... Sejal's Mother
 Baabul (2006)... Suman
 Rocky: The Rebel (2006)... Rocky's mother
 Darwaza Bandh Rakho (2006)... Sarita K. Shah
 Taxi No. 9211 (2006)... Rupali's mother
 Vaah! Life Ho Toh Aisi (2005)... Priya's mother
 Sab Kuch Hai Kuch Bhi Nahin (2005)... Shanti N. Malhotra
 Dil Maange More (2004)... Nikhil's mother
 Madhoshi (2004)... Mrs. Sumitra Kaul (Anupama's mom)
 Kismat (2004)... Mrs. Gosai
 Chori Chori (2003)... Mrs. Malhotra
 Om (2003) .... Om's mother
 Kyon? (2003) .... Prabha Mathur
 Surya (2003)
 Pyaasa (2002 film) (2002) .... Mrs. Thakur
 Mujhse Dosti Karoge (2002) .... Mrs. Khanna
 Kyaa Dil Ne Kahaa (2002) .... Maya (Rahul's mom)
 23rd March 1931: Shaheed (2002)
 Devdas (2002) .... Kaushalya
 Na Tum Jaano Na Hum (2002) .... Akshaye's mom
 Pyaar Diwana Hota Hai (2002) .... Mrs. Khurana
 Deewaanapan (2001) .... Suraj's mom
 Rehnaa Hai Terre Dil Mein (2001)
 Pyaar Ishq Aur Mohabbat (2001) .... Mrs. Sabarwal
 Yeh Raaste Hain Pyaar Ke (2001)
 Bas Itna Sa Khwaab Hai ... (2001) .... Gayetri C. Shrivastav
 Abhay... (2001) .... Tejaswini's mother
 Censor (2001) .... Mrs. Akhtar (Censor Board Member)
 Aashiq (2001) .... Pooja's mom
 Raju Chacha (2000) (as Smita Jaikar) .... Mother Superior
 Astitva (2000) .... Meghna
 Hamara Dil Aapke Paas Hai (2000) (as Smita Jayakar) .... Avinash's Mother
 Kunwara (2000) .... Balraj's Wife
 Hadh Kar Di Aapne (2000) .... Mrs. Khanna
 Phir Bhi Dil Hai Hindustani (2000) .... Ajay's mother
 Mast (1999) .... Sharda Mathur
 Hum Dil De Chuke Sanam (1999) .... Amrita
 Sarfarosh (1999) .... Ajay's Mother
 Hum Aapke Dil Mein Rehte Hain (1999) (as Smita Jaikar) .... Megha's mother
 Prem Aggan (1998) .... Mrs. Seema Singh
 Sar Utha Ke Jiyo (1998)
 Qila (1998) .... Suman A. Singh
 Pardes (1997) .... Padma (Paddy)
Dil Ka Doctor (1995)

Television roles 
 Kashibai Bajirao Ballal (2022) as Maharani Tarabai Rajaram I Bhosale
 Ghar Aaja Pardesi (2013).
 Noorjahan (2000-2001)
 Ghutan (TV series) (1997-1998)
 Daal Mein Kala (1998-1999) as Kiran
Khamosh awazein (1998)
 Kabhi Yeh Kabhi Woh (1994-1995) as Ramila
 Junoon as Aditya Dhanraj's mother
 Aahvaan (1988) as Uma
  Yahan Main Ghar Ghar Kheli (2009-2011) as Chandraprabha Udaypratap Singh

Stage credits 
 Aai Retire Hotey (2014) staged at Yashwantrao Chavan Natyagruha, Veena.

References

External links 
 
 Smita Jayakar Blog Website http://www.smitajayakar.com
 Smita Jayakar TEDx Talk https://www.youtube.com/watch?v=8mO62fxSyik

Indian film actresses
Indian television actresses
Actresses from Mumbai
Living people
Year of birth missing (living people)
Actresses in Hindi cinema
Actresses in Hindi television
20th-century Indian actresses
21st-century Indian actresses